Timothy J. Downing is an American attorney and former politician who served as the United States Attorney for the United States District Court for the Western District of Oklahoma from 2019 to 2021. He represented the 42nd district in the Oklahoma House of Representatives as a Republican from 2016 to 2018. He currently serves as a judge on the Oklahoma Court of Civil Appeals.

Education

Downing received his Bachelor of Arts from the University of Oklahoma, his Master of Management from Oral Roberts University, and his Juris Doctor from the Regent University School of Law.

Career and Military Service
From 2011 to 2016, Downing was an Assistant Attorney General for Oklahoma, where he represented the State of Oklahoma in criminal appeals, was a member of the Opinion Conference, and was Director of Legislative Affairs. Since 2011, he has also served as a Judge Advocate in the United States Army Reserve. In this capacity from 2013 to 2014, he served as a Special Assistant United States Attorney at Fort Hood, Texas, working with the United States Attorney's Office for the Western District of Texas.

Oklahoma House of Representatives

From 2016 to 2018, Downing served in the Oklahoma House of Representatives where he was an Assistant Majority Floor Leader, an Assistant Majority Whip, and Vice-Chair of Judiciary Committee.

U.S. Attorney for the Western District of Oklahoma

On March 1, 2019, President Donald Trump announced his intent to nominate Downing to be the U.S. Attorney for the Western District of Oklahoma. On March 5, 2019, his nomination was sent to the United States Senate. On May 9, 2019, his nomination was reported out of committee by voice vote. On May 23, 2019, the Senate confirmed his nomination by voice vote. He was sworn in on June 5, 2019. On February 9, 2021, he announced his resignation, effective February 28, 2021.

Oklahoma Court of Civil Appeals

After his resignation as U.S. Attorney in 2021, Downing served as the First Assistant Attorney General of Oklahoma as the chief executive for the Attorney General until he was appointed to the state judiciary. On May 27, 2022, Oklahoma Governor Kevin Stitt appointed Downing to the Oklahoma Court of Civil Appeals.

References

External links
 Biographies - Oklahoma Court of Civil Appeals
 Judicial Appointment
 Biography at Justice.gov

Living people
Date of birth missing (living people)
Place of birth missing (living people)
20th-century American lawyers
21st-century American lawyers
Assistant United States Attorneys
Judge Advocates General of the United States Army
Republican Party members of the Oklahoma House of Representatives
Oklahoma lawyers
Oral Roberts University alumni
Regent University School of Law alumni
United States Attorneys for the Western District of Oklahoma
University of Oklahoma alumni
1979 births